The Rundstrecken Challenge Nürburgring (RCN) (circuit racing challenge Nürburgring) or BMW Driving Experience Challenge, previously known as Castrol-HAUGG-Cup (CHC), is a motorsport event series. Being run since the early 1960s mainly on the Nürburgring, it is regarded as Germany's oldest touring car racing series. Unlike in regular races for position, the event that is similar to rallying on a closed race circuit, with time challenge laps and co-drivers on board.

For many years, the series was sponsored by Castrol and HAUGG (a company owned by a race driver, providing car parts like radiators). For 2007, the sponsorship arrangements were changed, putting less emphasis on these two companies.

The event is officially styled by the FIA/DMSB as a Leistungsprüfung 200km (LP200, performance test over 200 km). This means that the RCN is not a race for positions among cars that are started at once from a grid (like VLN endurance races), but a time trial, with cars being started one by one, about 5 seconds apart. This reduces the risks of collisions, as there is no benefit for a racer to defend their position.

Most RCN events are held on the Nürburgring, mainly on the 20.832 km long Nordschleife version, on Saturday afternoon following a Gleichmäßigkeitsprüfung (GLP) run by the same organizing club. One or two additional events are held on the Grand Prix track, or on the combined tracks as used in VLN or at the 24h. Since 2003, some events were held on the Circuit de Spa-Francorchamps. As season highlight in front of thousands of spectators, the RCN usually runs on the Thursday before a 24 Hours Nürburgring race, which is a holiday, either Ascension Day or Corpus Christi (feast). The track versions used during that event include various sections of the Grand Prix track. In 2005, the CHC was run on 4 different track versions, three of them at the Nürburgring.

On the Nordschleife, 15 laps of 20.832 km have to be run, for 312 km overall (longer than an F1 race). Due to being an amateur event without practise, the first (warm up) lap, the last (cool down) and two laps in between for a pit stop are not timed, unless a generous maximum time is exceeded. Of the remaining 11 laps, 9 are run at full speed (like a special stage in rallying), with each second counting as one penalty point. Two laps have to be done at a given time similar to a liaison stage in rallying. If the tolerance of +/- 2 seconds is exceeded, each second counts tenfold, so some discipline and precision is required. In wet conditions, these laps can decide the winners, as they can add a significant amount of penalty points to the tally.

The entry fee is about 400 Euro. As in rallying, a co-driver can be on board, a quite unique possibility to take a passenger within a circuit racing contest. Also, those two drivers can share a drive, which reduces costs for amateurs.

Championship points are awarded according to amateur rules, depending on the number of entrants in the same class. There are also an entry level "Light" classes with fewer laps, focusing on regularity, and a separate championship.

2006 Calendar  

For this season, no event on the Circuit de Spa-Francorchamps could be arranged due to construction work there. On the other hand, the Nordschleife is used 7 times, and the GP track only once. During the 24h race weekend, parts of the GP track are connected to the 20.8 km Nordschleife for a 25.3 km track.

Champions

External links 
 RCN (German only)
 GLP Nürburgring Regularity test (German only)
 Nürburgring Official website (also in English)

Touring car racing series
Auto racing series in Germany
Auto racing series in West Germany